Blue Mountain Peak is the highest mountain in Jamaica and one of the highest peaks in the Caribbean at . It is the home of Blue Mountain coffee. It is located on the border of the Portland and Saint Thomas parishes of Jamaica.

The Blue Mountain Peak is part of the Blue and John Crow Mountains National Park, which became a UNESCO World Heritage Site in 2015.

Hiking
The Blue Mountains are popular for hiking and camping. The traditional Blue Mountain trek is a  hike to the peak and consists of a  increase in elevation. Jamaicans prefer to reach the peak at sunrise, thus the 3- to 4-hour hike is usually undertaken in darkness. Since the sky is usually very clear in the mornings, Cuba can be seen in the distance.

There is a park fee to pay to hike on the peak.

Flora
The famous Blue Mountain coffee is grown on the mountain. The small coffee farming communities of Claverty Cottage and Hagley Gap are located near the peak.

Some of the plants found on the Blue Mountain cannot be found anywhere else in the world and they are often of a dwarfed sort. This is mainly due to the cold climate which inhibits growth.

Birds

See also
 List of Ultras of the Caribbean
 List of mountain peaks of the Caribbean

References

External links 

 

Mountains of Jamaica
Extreme points of Jamaica
Geography of Portland Parish
Geography of Saint Thomas Parish, Jamaica
Highest points of countries
Blue Mountains (Jamaica)